The Suresnes American Cemetery (French: Cimetière américain de Suresnes) is a United States military cemetery in the Suresnes, Hauts-de-Seine, France. It is the resting place of 1,541 American soldiers killed in World War I. A panoramic view of Paris can be seen from the site, which is located high on the slopes of Mont-Valérien.

History

Cemetery

Originally a World War I cemetery, designed in 1922 on Boulevard Washington by French architect Jacques Gréber, Suresnes American Cemetery now shelters the remains of U.S. dead of both World Wars. The  cemetery contains the remains of 1,541 Americans who died in World War I and 24 Unknown dead of World War II. Bronze tablets on the walls of the chapel record the names of 974 World War I missing. Rosettes mark the names of those since recovered and identified.

Memorial
The World War I memorial chapel was enlarged by the addition of two loggias dedicated to the dead of World Wars I and II, respectively. In the rooms at the ends of the loggias are white marble figures in memory of those who lost their lives in the two wars. Inscribed on the loggia walls is a summary of the loss of life in the Armed forces of the United States in each war, together with the location of the overseas commemorative cemeteries where American war dead are buried.

Notable burials
 Inez Crittenden (1887–1918), leader of the Signal Corps Female Telephone Operators Unit in France in World War I
 Willard Dickerman Straight (1880–1918), U.S. diplomat, investment banker, publisher, reporter and United States Army major

Gallery

See also
 American Battle Monuments Commission
 World War I memorials

References

Further reading

External links

 Government
 
 General information
 
 

American Battle Monuments Commission
Cemeteries in Hauts-de-Seine
World War I cemeteries in France
World War I memorials in France
World War II cemeteries in France
World War II memorials in France
American Cemetery and Memorial